Jean-Emmanuel-Marie Le Maout  (29 December 1799, Guingamp – 23 June 1877, Paris) was a French  naturalist.

In 1842, Le Maout  qualified as a physician  at the University of Paris, where he became a demonstrator of natural sciences in the Faculty of Medicine. Later he gave private lessons in  literature and  natural history. He was decorated with the Légion d'honneur in 1869.

in 1854, botanist Hugh Algernon Weddell published Maoutia which is a genus of shrubs or small trees in the nettle family (Urticaceae and named in his honour.

Works 
Le Jardin des Plantes  (1842, 2 vol. in-8), with Louis Couailhac (1810–1885)  and Pierre Bernard (1810–1876).
Cahiers de physique, de chimie et d'histoire naturelle (1841, in-4)
Leçons analytiques de lecture à haute voix (1842, in-8; nouvelle édition, 1856)
Leçons élémentaires de botanique, précédées d'un Spécimen, en 1843 (2 part, avec 500 gravures, 1845, 3e édition, 1867)
Atlas élémentaire de botanique (1848, 1684 fig.), avec texte en regard
Les Mammifères et les Oiseaux (1851–1854, 2 vol. gr. in-8, illustrés), belle publication d'où l'éditeur a tiré ses principaux envois à l'Exposition universelle de 1855
Flore élémentaire des jardins et des champs (1855, in-18, 2e édition, 1865)
Traité général de botanique (1867, in-4, 5 500 figures) avec Joseph Decaisne (1807–1882). English edition 1873.
Les Trois Règnes de la Nature Tournefort Linné Jussieu (Curmer, 1851).

References

Bibliography

External links 
 

1799 births
1877 deaths
People from Guingamp
French ornithologists
19th-century French botanists
Chevaliers of the Légion d'honneur